The Visayan pygmy babbler (Dasycrotapha pygmaea) is a bird species endemic to the Philippines (Leyte and Samar). It belongs to the genus Dasycrotapha. It was placed in the family Timaliidae, but recently found to be better placed in the family Zosteropidae.

It was formerly included with the Mindanao pygmy babbler (D. plateni) under the common name of "pygmy babbler".

Its natural habitats are subtropical or tropical moist lowland forests and subtropical or tropical moist montane forests. It is becoming rare due to habitat loss.

References
Collar, N. J. & Robson, C. 2007. Family Timaliidae (Babblers)  pp. 70 – 291 in; del Hoyo, J., Elliott, A. & Christie, D.A. eds. Handbook of the Birds of the World, Vol. 12. Picathartes to Tits and Chickadees. Lynx Edicions, Barcelona.
Moyle, R. G., C. E. Filardi, C. E. Smith, and J. Diamond. 2009. Explosive Pleistocene diversification and hemispheric expansion of a "great speciator." Proceedings of the National Academy of Sciences of the United States of America 106: 1863–1868.

Visayan pygmy babbler
Endemic birds of the Philippines
Fauna of the Visayas
Visayan pygmy babbler
Visayan pygmy babbler